The Roman Catholic Diocese of San Marcos (erected 10 March 1951) is a suffragan diocese of the Archdiocese of Los Altos Quetzaltenango-Totonicapán.

Bishops

Ordinaries
Celestino Miguel Fernández Pérez, O.F.M. (1955–1971)
Próspero Penados del Barrio (1971–1983), appointed Archbishop of Guatemala
Julio Amílcar Bethancourt Fioravanti (1984–1988), appointed Bishop of Huehuetenango
Álvaro Leonel Ramazzini Imeri (1988–2012), appointed Bishop of Huehuetenango on 14 May 2012; future Cardinal
Carlos Enrique Trinidad Gómez (2014–2018)
Bernabé de Jesús Sagastume Lemus, O.F.M. Cap (2021–present)

Auxiliary bishops
Próspero Penados del Barrio (1966–1971), appointed Bishop here

Other priest of this diocese who became bishop
Félix Eduardo Antonio Calderón Cruz, appointed Bishop of San Francisco de Asís de Jutiapa in 2016

Territorial losses

References

San Marcos
Roman Catholic Ecclesiastical Province of Los Altos Quetzaltenango-Totonicapán